The Seward Highway is a highway in the U.S. state of Alaska that extends  from Seward to Anchorage. It was completed in 1951 and runs through the scenic Kenai Peninsula, Chugach National Forest, Turnagain Arm, and Kenai Mountains. The Seward Highway is numbered Alaska Route 9 (AK-9) for the first  from Seward to the Sterling Highway and AK-1 for the remaining distance to Anchorage. At the junction with the Sterling Highway, AK-1 turns west towards Sterling and Homer. About  of the Seward Highway leading into Anchorage is built to freeway standards. In Anchorage, the Seward Highway terminates at an intersection with 5th Avenue, which AK-1 is routed to, and which then leads to the Glenn Highway freeway.

Route description
The full length of the Seward Highway has been listed on the National Highway System (NHS), a network of roads important to the country's economy, defense, and mobility. The segment designated AK-9 between Seward and Tern Lake Junction is part of the STRAHNET subsystem, highways that are important to defense policy and which provide defense access, continuity and emergency capabilities for defense purposes. The remainder that follows AK-1 is also designated Interstate A-1 (A-1) and included in the NHS on that basis. The state's Interstate Highways are not required to comply with Interstate Highway standards, instead "shall be designed in accordance with such geometric and construction standards as are adequate for current and probable future traffic demands and the needs of the locality of the highway" under federal law. The highway is maintained by the Alaska Department of Transportation & Public Facilities (Alaska DOT&PF), and the A-1 designation is not signed along the highway. In 2010, 2,520 vehicles used the highway near the junction with Sterling Highway in a measure of the annual average daily traffic, the lowest tally along the highway. The highest traffic count as recorded by Alaska DOT&PF was 58,799 vehicles daily at the Dowling Road overpass in Anchorage. In 2012, Life magazine included the Seward Highway in its list of Most Scenic Drives in the World.

Seward to Bear Creek

At this point, the Seward Highway is two lanes, with a parking lane on each side. The Seward Highway is designated as AK-9 at this point of the route. The highway continues through downtown Seward and residential areas. The highway continues past the Seward Airport and Exit Glacier road, before entering the unincorporated community of Bear Creek. Just after entering Bear Creek, a series of tracks belonging to the Alaska Railroad comes alongside the roadway. These railroad tracks continue on with the Seward Highway until Moose Pass, return near a junction with the Portage Glacier Highway, and remain until the highway becomes a freeway, in southern Anchorage. The Seward Highway proceeds through central Bear Creek, passing Bear Lake, until entering Chugach National Forest.

Chugach National Forest

The Seward Highway enters the Chugach National Forest just  after its start. The highway enters the Chugach National Forest while it is still part of the Bear Creek community, so it gives the appearance of still being inside that census-designated place. After a mile or so (1.6 km) though, the area surrounding the highway begins to look more like a national forest. The Alaska Railroad weaves back and forth under the highway, which causes the highway to traverse a series of small bridges. For a few miles after the bridges, the Seward Highway is a four-lane road, but then merges back to two lane. For the next five or so miles (8 km), the route runs on a thin strip of land between the mountains and Kenai Lake. At the northern end of Kenai Lake, the route passes through Crown Point, and provides access to a large campground where Trail Creek empties into Kenai Lake. The road continues, passing along Upper Trail Lake for a few miles, before returning to the dense forest, and passing a large mountain range. After a few more miles, the road passes the Tern Lake Junction, and intersects with Alaska Route 1 (AK-1) (also known as the Sterling Highway), where Alaska Route 9 terminates, and the Seward Highway is designated to AK-1.

It is at this point that the road begins to climb into the actual mountains to approach Turnagain Pass. For several miles, the roadway continues through large, Alaskan spruce forests. The road then continues through the mountains. The route continues through the mountains for about  more, before a steep decline, at which point the highway exits the Kenai Peninsula and continues along the shores Turnagain Arm. Just after reaching Turnagain Arm, the highway enters the city limits of Anchorage (and remains within Anchorage proper for the remainder of its route). After intersecting the Portage Glacier Highway the Alaska Railroad tracks again come alongside the route. It then exits the Chugach National Forest, having spent approximately  inside its boundaries.

Girdwood to Anchorage

After the highway exits the National Forest, it continues for about  through spruce forest, before passing the community of Girdwood. After about a mile, the highway enters Chugach State Park. The road continues through forest for about  more, before passing the small skiing village of Bird. The route reenters the park for about a mile, before entering the village of Indian, and then reentering the forest. The highway then proceeds to enter the suburban area of Anchorage. The highway intersects Old Seward Highway, before becoming a four-lane freeway. The freeway's first exit is, in fact, for Old Seward Highway. The freeway continues past several neighborhoods, a plant nursery, and Rabbit Creek Elementary School.

At an exit for De Armoun Road, the highway's frontage road begins. The freeway continues past dozens of neighborhoods, a few small businesses, and provides exits for a few small roads, including the Minnesota Drive Expressway. After the exit for Abbott Road, part of the frontage road terminates. The route then passes through a more commercial area of Anchorage, passing several warehouses. At the freeway's final exit, for Tudor Road, the rest of the frontage roads either begin or terminate. The freeway ends at the highway's intersection with East 36th Avenue. About a half a mile (1 km) later, the highway splits into Ingra Street (northbound), and Gambell Street (southbound). The Seward Highway officially reaches its northern terminus at an intersection with 5th Avenue. AK-1 continues on for a short period as 5th Avenue, before becoming known as the Glenn Highway.

History

An  stretch of the Seward Highway, traveling from Seward to Kenai Lake was completed in 1923. Another segment of the highway, running between Moose Pass and Hope, was completed in 1928. The Mile 18 bridge, nicknamed "The Missing Link", which would connect the Seward and Moose Pass portions, was not completed until 1946, which was a major cause of the delayed completion of the highway. The roadway was completed on October 19, 1951, connecting Seward to the major city of Anchorage by road for the first time (Seward was previously reached by sea, rail, or air). The entire length of the highway was paved in 1952.

The highway was designated a National Forest Scenic Byway by the United States Forest Service on September 8, 1989. Later, the State of Alaska added it to the State Scenic Byway system on January 29, 1993. The final designation was added on June 15, 2000, when the Seward Highway was named an All-American Road as part of the National Scenic Byway program by the United States Secretary of Transportation. The length of the highway traveling from the AK-1 and AK-9 intersection to the northern terminus is designated as Interstate A-3 by the National Highway System.

In July 2016, Alaska DOT&PF officials posted updated speed limits on a  section of the Seward Highway south of Anchorage between Hope Junction to the top of Turnagain Pass. The project is designed to enhance safety and improve congestion by enforcing passing lane usage.

In 2017, Alaska DOT&PF announced a four-year Milepost 75–90 Rehabilitation Project, scheduled to begin in 2018, to make major safety improvements to a busy crash-prone section of the Seward Highway from Girdwood to beyond the Portage curve toward Turnagain Pass ending at Ingram Creek. In July 2015 a tour bus crash at milepost 79 killed one man and critically injured several others, causing a 10-hour traffic jam. During the summer months, up to 15,000 vehicles use this  stretch of Seward Highway daily.

Interstate Highway System

Seward Highway is part of the unsigned part of the Interstate Highway System as Interstate A-3.

U.S. Bicycle Route 97

United States Bicycle Route 97 is a U.S. Bicycle Route located along Alaska Route 1. The bike route runs alongside the Seward Highway along the entire length of the highway. The bike route was created in 2011.

Major intersections

Old Seward Highway

The Old Seward Highway is a nearly  former routing of the Seward Highway. The road is located entirely within the corporate limits of Anchorage, with a southern terminus near the Potter Section House, and a northern terminus in the Midtown neighborhood. Both of this highway's termini are points on the Seward Highway. The highway was created in 1951, along with most of the current Seward Highway.

The Old Seward Highway begins at an intersection with Potter Valley Road, less than 500 feet from Potter Valley Road's own terminus with the (new) Seward Highway. From there, Old Seward Highway curves along the east side of Potter Marsh opposite the New Seward Highway (on the west side) before intersecting Rabbit Creek Road, again less than a 1/4 mile from the New Seward Highway, which is at this point a four-lane freeway. From there, Old Seward Highway travels northwest over the New Seward Highway and through the neighborhood of Oceanview. The route bends north, running parallel to the New Seward Highway. The roadway intersects O'Malley Road and continues northward through the Campbell/Taku neighborhood. The road proceeds north into Midtown, traveling through the neighborhood to the highway's northern terminus, an intersection with 33rd Avenue near the Moose's Tooth Pub and Pizzeria. An exit ramp from the New Seward Highway serves as the beginning of the southbound lanes.

The Old Seward Highway was created in 1951, as part of the original routing of the Seward Highway. Beginning in 1976, the state of Alaska designated three projects to reroute a large portion of the Seward Highway. This rerouting would bypass the section of the highway that is now the Old Seward Highway. The final portion of the rerouting was completed in early June 1998.

See also

 List of Alaska Routes
 Chugach State Park
 Coastal Classic

References

External links

 Seward Highway on America's Byways
 A journey down the Seward Highway
 National Geographic Seward Highway Road Trip
 Anchorage to Seward (Seward Highway) on Alaska.org
 Alaska road trip time lapse. Seward highway: 2 hrs in 7 mins shot on Contour +2
 Seward Highway Scenic Guide

All-American Roads
National Forest Scenic Byways
Interstate Highways in Alaska
State highways in Alaska
Transportation in Kenai Peninsula Borough, Alaska
Transportation in Anchorage, Alaska
Kenai Mountains-Turnagain Arm National Heritage Area
Freeways in the United States